Low Juan Shen (Chinese: 刘隽程, born 30 December 1993) is a Malaysian badminton player. He won the men's doubles title at the 2018 World University Championships partnered with Nur Mohd Azriyn Ayub.

Achievements

Summer Universiade 
Men's doubles

World University Championships 
Men's doubles

BWF Grand Prix (1 runner-up) 
The BWF Grand Prix had two levels, the BWF Grand Prix and Grand Prix Gold. It was a series of badminton tournaments sanctioned by the Badminton World Federation (BWF) which was held from 2007 to 2017.

Men's doubles

  BWF Grand Prix Gold tournament
  BWF Grand Prix tournament

BWF International Challenge/Series (5 titles, 1 runner-up) 
Men's doubles

  BWF International Challenge tournament
  BWF International Series tournament
  BWF Future Series tournament

References

External links 
 
 Low Juan Shen on YouTube

Living people
1993 births
People from Negeri Sembilan
Malaysian sportspeople of Chinese descent
Malaysian male badminton players
Universiade bronze medalists for Malaysia
Universiade medalists in badminton
Medalists at the 2015 Summer Universiade